The 2017–18 Weber State Wildcats women's basketball team represents Weber State University during the 2017–18 NCAA Division I women's basketball season. The Wildcats were led by sixth year head coach Bethann Ord and play their home games at the Dee Events Center. They were members of the Big Sky Conference. They finished the season 21–10, 11–7 in Big Sky play to finish in a tie for third place. They lost in the quarterfinals of the Big Sky women's tournament to Idaho State. They were invited to the WBI where they defeated Texas Southern in the first round before losing to Central Arkansas in the quarterfinals.

On June 7, it was announced that Bethann Ord has resigned from Weber State and accept the head coaching job at Binghamton. She finished at Weber State with a 6 year record of 77–137.

Radio Broadcasts
All Wildcats games are heard on KWCR with Nick Bailey calling the action. All home games and conference road games are also streamed with video live online through Watch Big Sky .

Roster

Schedule

|-
!colspan=9 style="background:#; color:#FFFFFF;"| Exhibition

|-
!colspan=8 style="background:#; color:#FFFFFF;"| Non-conference regular season

|-
!colspan=8 style="background:#; color:#FFFFFF;"| Big Sky regular season

|-
!colspan=9 style="background:#;"| Big Sky Women's Tournament

|-
!colspan=9 style="background:#;"| WBI

See also
2017–18 Weber State Wildcats men's basketball team

References

Weber State Wildcats women's basketball seasons
Weber State
Weber State